Katchadourian is an Armenian surname. Notable people with the surname include:

 Aram Khachaturian (1903–1978), Soviet Armenian composer
 Nina Katchadourian (born 1968), American artist
 Kevin Khatchadourian, principal character in We Need to Talk About Kevin, a novel by Lionel Shriver
 Ashley Katchadorian, a character from the animated web series The Most Popular Girls in School
 Sarkis Katchadourian (1886–1947), Armenian artist
 Raffi Khatchadourian, American journalist

Armenian-language surnames